is a song recorded by Japanese music duo Yoasobi from their debut EP, The Book (2021). It was released on December 18, 2020, as a digital single, through Sony Music Entertainment Japan. It was based on Tsuki Ōji  ( "Moon Prince"), a novel written by screenwriter Osamu Suzuki. The accompanying music video premiered alongside the single release. The English version of the song was included on the duo's second English-language EP E-Side 2, released on November 18, 2022.

Composition and lyrics

"Haruka" describes about an encounter and farewell, drawn from the perspective of "something" that has watched over the growth of a girl more than anyone else, composed in the key of C♯ major, 100 beats per minute with a running time of 4 minutes and 4 seconds.

Credits and personnel

Credits adapted from The Book liner notes.

 Ayase – producer, songwriter
 Ikura – vocals
 Takayuki Saitō – vocal recording
 Masahiko Fukui – mixing
 Osamu Suzuki – based story writer
 Kanae Izumi – music video animation, cover artwork design

Charts

Weekly charts

Year-end charts

Certifications

Release history

References

External links
 Tsuki Ōji on Monogatary.com

2020 singles
2020 songs
Japanese-language songs
Sony Music Entertainment Japan singles
Yoasobi songs